Sa’d al-Din Köpek (Sa’d al-Dīn Kobek bin Muhammad; , died 1238) was a court administrator under two 13th century Seljuq Sultans of Rum and is known for his indirect role in the subjugation of the Sultanate of Rum by the Mongol Empire due to his disloyalty and aim for greater power during the turbulent 13th century in Anatolia.

He served as Master of the Hunt and Minister of Works under Kayqubad I and, after in the latter capacity, supervised the construction of Kubadabad Palace on the shore of Lake Beyşehir.

Biography 
Köpek, as an advisor to Kayqubad's successor Kaykhusraw II, grew his influence considerably. His first aim was to secure the reign of the new sultan. He had Kaykhusraw's two half-brothers strangled along with their mother, an Ayyubid princess, but he did not become successful, was later killed by Husam al-Din Qaraja, and was hanged on the Seljuk palace walls for treason. It was also known that he wanted the throne of Seljuq and had made his connections with Mongols. He suspected the loyalty of the Khwarezmians, the remnant followers of Jalal al-Din Manguberti whom Kayqubad had installed in various Anatolian fortresses, and had their leader, a certain Kirkhan, imprisoned. The Khwarezmians abandoned their posts and fled to Diyar Mudar, where they applied to the Ayyubids for work as mercenaries. Köpek's suspicion deprived the sultanate of seasoned soldiers at a time of external threat and internal instability.

Known as Zazadin Han, the caravanserai bears two inscriptions: one naming Köpek as founder and dated 1235–36, the other indicating the patronage of both Kayqubad I and Kaykhusraw II.

In popular culture 
In the Turkish television series, Diriliş: Ertuğrul, Sa’d al-Din Köpek is portrayed by Turkish actor, Murat Garipağaoğlu. In the series, Sa’d al-Din Köpek's name is in Turkish, as  The Amir Sadettin Köpek, and is shown as a traitor and is eventually beheaded by the protagonist, Ertuğrul.

References

Sources
Claude Cahen, Pre-Ottoman Turkey: A general survey of the material and spiritual culture and history c. 1071-1330 (Taplinger: New York 1968), 133–34.
Carole Hillenbrand, “Sa’d al-Dīn Köpek b. Muhammad” Encyclopaedia of Islam, ed. by P. Bearman, et al. (Brill 2007).
SÂDEDDİN KÖPEK(in Turkish) — An article published in the 35th Volume of TDV İslâm Ansiklopedisi, pp. 392–393, in Istanbul (2008)

External links
Turkish Hans: Zazadin Han near Konya.

People from the Sultanate of Rum
Seljuk dynasty
Oghuz Turks
1240 deaths